Qal'ai Khumb (Qal‘a‘i Xumb/Qal'haji Xumв - meaning fortress on the banks of the river of Khumb) or Qal'a-i-Khum, also Kalai-Khumb (transliterated from ), is a small town located in the Gorno-Badakhshan Autonomous Region in Tajikistan on the border with Afghanistan. Formerly it was the capital of the independent  Principality of Darvaz. Now it is the capital of the Darvoz District of Tajikistan.  Here the Pamir Highway meets the Panj River.

The village is an important overnight rest stop between Kulob and Khorugh, located at a distance of 168 km from Kulob (or 368 km from Dushanbe) and 235 km from Khorugh. It has several hostels to accommodate travelers on their way between cities. The village is almost entirely surrounded by the Pamir Mountains.

On the Afghan border Kalai-Khumb has one of the three bridges over the Panj river. On the Sunday market there used to be trades from Afghanistan near this bridge. Although Kalai-Khumb now has no such market.

References

Populated places in Gorno-Badakhshan